Life as We Know It is the twelfth studio album by REO Speedwagon, released in 1987 (see 1987 in music).  

It features "That Ain't Love" and "In My Dreams", both of which were Top 20 hits while "Variety Tonight" reached #60 on the Hot 100. "One Too Many Girlfriends" showcased the growing tensions between band members Kevin Cronin and Gary Richrath. At one point, "New Way to Love" was considered for use in the film Top Gun. 

This is the group's final studio release with Richrath and original drummer Alan Gratzer, as well as their final top 40 album to date.

Track listing

Personnel 

REO Speedwagon
 Kevin Cronin – lead vocals (1-8, 10), backing vocals (1, 3, 7, 10), rhythm "left side" guitar (1, 4, 5, 8, 9, 10), acoustic guitar (2, 3, 6, 7)
 Gary Richrath – lead guitar (1, 2, 4-10), rhythm "right side" guitar (1, 4, 5, 10), electric guitar (3)
 Neal Doughty – acoustic piano (1), synthesizers (2-10), organ (3, 4, 10), Emulator sax (6)
 Bruce Hall – bass, lead vocals (9)
 Alan Gratzer – drums

Additional musicians
 Steve Forman – percussion (3, 10)
 Greg Smith – baritone saxophone (1, 10), bass saxophone (1)
 Lon Price – tenor saxophone (1, 10), horn arrangements (1, 10), soprano saxophone (10)
 Paris Cronin – alto saxophone (10)
 Nick Lane – trombone (10)
 Rick Braun – trumpet (10)
 Lee Thornburg – trumpet (10)
 Bob Carlisle – backing vocals (2, 3, 4, 7)
 Tom Kelly – backing vocals (2, 3, 4)
 Julia Waters – backing vocals (5, 10)
 Maxine Waters – backing vocals (5, 10)
 Terry Wood – backing vocals (5, 10)

Production 
 Kevin Cronin – producer 
 Alan Gratzer – producer 
 Gary Richrath – producer 
 David DeVore – producer, engineer 
 Julian Stoll – assistant engineer 
 Steve Hall – mastering at Future Disc (Hollywood, California).
 Dave Snow – art coordinator 
 REO Speedwagon – cover concept 
 Donald Ryan – cover artwork 
 Aaron Rapoport – photography

References

 REO Speedwagon - Life As We Know It @ MSN Music

REO Speedwagon albums
1987 albums
Epic Records albums
Albums produced by Gary Richrath
Albums produced by Kevin Cronin